In research, a paper mill is a "profit oriented, unofficial and potentially illegal organisation that produces and sells authorship on research manuscripts. In some cases, paper mills are sophisticated operations that sell authorship positions on legitimate research, but in many cases the papers contain fraudulent data and can be heavily plagiarized or otherwise unprofessional. According to a report from Nature, thousands of papers in academic journals have been traced to paper mills from China, Iran and Russia, and some journals are revamping their review processes."

It is a problem of research ethics and research integrity affecting academic publishing (academic writing, scientific writing and medical writing). It is an instance of academic dishonesty involving contract cheating and authorship, more specifically academic ghostwriting or medical ghostwriter.  
It may include data fabrication, leading to junk science, and sometimes to retractions in the scientific literature (scientific journals, academic journals, or medical journals).

Examples

In early 2022, Times Higher Education and the Science Magazine News department covered a report exposing a Russian paper mill companyInternational Publisher Ltd. The report identified hundreds of published academic papers where positions for authorship had been sold through a Russian website allowing researchers to pay for academic prestige without requiring legitimate research contributions. During the three-year period analyzed, 419 articles were identified that were matched to manuscripts later published in many different academic journals, with a significant bias towards publications in predatory journals. While the paper mill targeted various journals, almost 100 papers were published in International Journal of Emerging Technologies in Learning (Kassel University Press) alone, seemingly coordinated through the involvement of journal editors hosting Special Issues with space for coauthors auctioned off for anywhere from $180–5000 USD. In a separate network, guest editors and salaried academic editors for MDPI were found to coordinate sale of authorship across four different MDPI journals, totalling over 20 papers (picture, right). Beyond collusion between editors and International Publisher Ltd., many legitimate research papers also sold authorship unknown to the journal editors, and were ultimately accepted in journals published by Elsevier, Oxford University Press, Springer Nature, Taylor & Francis, Wolters Kluwer, and Wiley-Blackwell. As of April 6, 2022, many of these publishers have opened an investigation into the matter.

See also
Academic mill (disambiguation)
Publish or perish
Essay mill

References

Academic terminology
Scientific misconduct